Duotones is the fourth studio album by American saxophonist Kenny G, released on September 29, 1986 by Arista Records. It features one of Kenny G's best-known songs, "Songbird", which reached number four on the US Billboard Hot 100.

The album peaked at number one on the Contemporary Jazz Albums chart, number five on the Jazz Albums chart, number six on the Billboard 200 and number eight on the R&B Albums chart. The album was later certified 5× Platinum by the RIAA.

Track listing
An alternate track listing of this album also exists. It includes a slightly altered track order. In addition, this version includes slightly longer versions of "Don't Make Me Wait For Love" and "What Does it Take (To Win Your Love)" and adds an extra track: "And You Know That". The track listing is as follows:

CD Version 2

Production 
 Produced by Preston Glass.
 Executive Producer – Narada Michael Walden
 Co-producer on Tracks 1, 2, 4, & 9 – Kenny G
 Engineered by Gordon Lyon
 Assistant Engineers – Kay Arbuckle, Stuart Hirotsu, Matt Rohr and Jim Weyeneth.
 Mastered by Ted Jensen at Sterling Sound (New York, NY).
 Art Direction and Design – Kevin K. Takishita
 Photography – Steven Rothfield
 Management and Direction – Ken Fritz and Dennis Turner
 Styling – Kurt DeMunbrun

Personnel 
 Kenny G – all saxophones, keyboards, synth bass, drum machine, backing vocals, all instruments (9), EWI controller (violins) (9)
 Walter Afanasieff – keyboards, synth bass 
 Preston Glass – keyboards, drum machine, wind chimes (1), backing vocals 
 Roger Sause – keyboards 
 Alan Glass – guitars 
 John Raymond – guitars 
 Corrado Rustici – guitars 
 Randy Jackson – bass guitar, synth bass 
 Cory Lerios – synth bass, drum machine 
 Joe Plass – bass guitar 
 Gigi Gonaway – drums, percussion 
 Kenny McDougald – drums 
 Tony Gable – percussion 
 Sal Gallina – EWI controller (string sounds, violins and French horns) (3)
 Kitty Beethoven – backing vocals 
 Gina Glass – backing vocals 
 Yolanda Glass – backing vocals 
 Claytoven Richardson – backing vocals 
 Lenny Williams – backing vocals

Charts

Weekly charts

Year-end charts

Singles

Certifications

References 

1986 albums
Arista Records albums
Kenny G albums
Albums produced by Narada Michael Walden